Naomi A. Klein (born May 8, 1970) is a Canadian author, social activist, and filmmaker known for her political analyses, support of ecofeminism, organized labour, left-wing politics and criticism of corporate globalization, fascism, ecofascism and capitalism. As of 2021 she is Associate Professor, and Professor of Climate Justice at the University of British Columbia, co-directing a Centre for Climate Justice. 

Klein first became known internationally for her alter-globalization book No Logo (1999). The Take (2004), a documentary film about Argentina's occupied factories, written by her and directed by her husband Avi Lewis, further increased her profile, while The Shock Doctrine (2007), a critical analysis of the history of neoliberal economics, solidified her standing as a prominent activist on the international stage. The Shock Doctrine was adapted into a six-minute companion film by Alfonso and Jonás Cuarón, as well as a feature-length documentary by Michael Winterbottom. Klein's This Changes Everything: Capitalism vs. the Climate (2014) was a New York Times non-fiction bestseller and the winner of the Hilary Weston Writers' Trust Prize for Nonfiction.

In 2016, Klein was awarded the Sydney Peace Prize for her activism on climate justice. Klein frequently appears on global and national lists of top influential thinkers, including the 2014 Thought Leaders ranking compiled by the Gottlieb Duttweiler Institute, Prospect magazine's world thinkers 2014 poll, and Maclean's 2014 Power List. She was formerly a member of the board of directors of the climate activist group 350.org.

Family
Naomi Klein was born in Montreal, Quebec, and brought up in a Jewish family with a history of peace activism. Her parents were self-described hippies who emigrated from the United States in 1967 as war resisters to the Vietnam War. Her mother, documentary film-maker Bonnie Sherr Klein, is best known for her anti-pornography film Not a Love Story. Her father, Michael Klein, is a physician and a member of Physicians for Social Responsibility. Her brother, Seth Klein, is an author and the former director of the British Columbia office of the Canadian Centre for Policy Alternatives.

Before World War II, her paternal grandparents were communists, but they began to turn against the Soviet Union after the Molotov–Ribbentrop Pact in 1939. In 1942, her grandfather, an animator at Disney, was fired after the 1941 strike, and had to switch to working in a shipyard instead. By 1956 they had abandoned communism. Klein's father grew up surrounded by ideas of social justice and racial equality, but found it "difficult and frightening to be the child of Communists", a so-called red diaper baby.

Klein's husband, Avi Lewis, was born into a political and journalistic family. His grandfather, David Lewis, was an architect and leader of the federal New Democratic Party, while his father, Stephen Lewis, was a leader of the Ontario New Democratic Party. Avi Lewis works as a TV journalist and documentary filmmaker. The couple's only child, son Toma, was born on June 13, 2012.

Early life

Klein spent much of her teenage years in shopping malls, obsessed with designer labels. As a child and teenager, she found it "very oppressive to have a very public feminist mother" and she rejected politics, instead embracing "full-on consumerism".

She has attributed her change in worldview to two catalysts. One was when she was 17 and preparing for the University of Toronto, her mother had a stroke and became severely disabled. Naomi, her father, and her brother took care of Bonnie through the period in hospital and at home, making educational sacrifices to do so. That year off prevented her "from being such a brat". The next year, after beginning her studies at the University of Toronto, the second catalyst occurred: the 1989 École Polytechnique massacre of female engineering students, which proved to be a wake-up call to feminism.

Klein's writing career began with contributions to The Varsity, a student newspaper, where she served as editor-in-chief.  After her third year at the University of Toronto, she dropped out of university to take a job at The Globe and Mail, followed by an editorship at This Magazine. In 1995, she returned to the University of Toronto with the intention of finishing her degree but left University to pursue an internship in journalism before acquiring the final credits required to complete her degree.

Works

No Logo

In 1999 Klein published the book No Logo, which for many became a manifesto of the anti-globalization movement. In it, she attacks brand-oriented consumer culture and the operations of large corporations. She also accuses several such corporations of unethically exploiting workers in the world's poorest countries in pursuit of greater profits. In this book, Klein criticized Nike so severely that Nike published a point-by-point response. No Logo became an international bestseller, selling over one million copies in over 28 languages.

Fences and Windows

Klein's Fences and Windows (2002) is a collection of her articles and speeches written on behalf of the anti-globalization movement (all proceeds from the book go to benefit activist organizations through The Fences and Windows Fund).

The Take

The Take (2004), a documentary film collaboration by Klein and Lewis, concerns factory workers in Argentina who took over a closed plant and resumed production, operating as a collective. The first African screening was in the Kennedy Road shack settlement in the South African city of Durban, where the Abahlali baseMjondolo movement began.

An article in Z Communications criticized The Take for its portrayal of the Argentine general and politician Juan Domingo Perón arguing that he was falsely portrayed as a social democrat.

The Shock Doctrine

Klein's third book, The Shock Doctrine: The Rise of Disaster Capitalism, was published on September 4, 2007. The book argues that the free market policies of Nobel Laureate Milton Friedman and the Chicago School of Economics have risen to prominence in countries such as Chile, under Pinochet, Poland, Russia, under Yeltsin. The book also argues that policy initiatives (for instance, the privatization of Iraq's economy under the Coalition Provisional Authority) were rushed through while the citizens of these countries were in shock from disasters, upheavals, or invasion. The book became an international and New York Times bestseller and was translated into 28 languages.

Central to the book's thesis is the contention that those who wish to implement unpopular free market policies now routinely do so by taking advantage of certain features of the aftermath of major disasters, be they economic, political, military or natural. The suggestion is that when a society experiences a major 'shock' there is a widespread desire for a rapid and decisive response to correct the situation; this desire for bold and immediate action provides an opportunity for unscrupulous actors to implement policies which go far beyond a legitimate response to disaster. The book suggests that when the rush to act means the specifics of a response will go unscrutinized, that is the moment when unpopular and unrelated policies will intentionally be rushed into effect. The book appears to claim that these shocks are in some cases intentionally encouraged or even manufactured.

Klein identifies the "shock doctrine", elaborating on Joseph Schumpeter, as the latest in capitalism's phases of "creative destruction".

The Shock Doctrine was adapted into a short film of the same name, released onto YouTube. The original is no longer available on the site, however, a duplicate was published in 2008. The film was directed by Jonás Cuarón, produced and co-written by his father Alfonso Cuarón. The original video was viewed over one million times.

The publication of The Shock Doctrine increased Klein's prominence, with The New Yorker judging her "the most visible and influential figure on the American left—what Howard Zinn and Noam Chomsky were thirty years ago." On February 24, 2009, the book was awarded the inaugural Warwick Prize for Writing from the University of Warwick in England. The prize carried a cash award of £50,000.

This Changes Everything: Capitalism vs. the Climate

Klein's fourth book, This Changes Everything: Capitalism vs. the Climate was published in September 2014. The book puts forth the argument that the hegemony of neoliberal market fundamentalism is blocking any serious reforms to halt climate change and protect the environment. Questioned about Klein's claim that capitalism and controlling climate change were incompatible, Benoit Blarel, manager of the Environment and Natural Resources global practice at the World Bank, said that the write-off of fossil fuels necessary to control climate change "will have a huge impact all over" and that the World Bank was "starting work on this". The book won the 2014 Hilary Weston Writers' Trust Prize for Nonfiction, and was a shortlisted nominee for the 2015 Shaughnessy Cohen Prize for Political Writing.

No Is Not Enough: Resisting Trump's Shock Politics and Winning the World We Need
Klein's fifth book, No Is Not Enough: Resisting Trump's Shock Politics and Winning the World We Need was published in June 2017. It has also been published internationally with the alternative subtitle Defeating the New Shock Politics. Writing in Geographical, Chris Fitch described this book as arguing for "radical change, and for bold, ambitious policies, to provide a credible alternative to the world vision of the Trump White House, and avert the worst effects of climate change."

The Battle for Paradise: Puerto Rico Takes on the Disaster Capitalists
Released in June 2018 as paperback and e-book, The Battle for Paradise: Puerto Rico Takes on the Disaster Capitalists covers what San Juan Mayor Carmen Yulín Cruz refers to as the post-Hurricane Maria unmasked colonialism leading to inequality and "creating a fierce humanitarian crisis."

On Fire: The (Burning) Case for a Green New Deal 

In April 2019, Simon & Schuster announced they would be publishing Klein's seventh book, On Fire: The (Burning) Case for a Green New Deal, which was published on September 17, 2019.  On Fire is a collection of essays focusing on climate change and the urgent actions needed to preserve the world.  Klein relates her meeting with Greta Thunberg in the opening essay in which she discusses the entrance of young people into those speaking out for climate awareness and change. She supports the Green New Deal throughout the book and in the final essay she discusses the 2020 U.S. election stating: "The stakes of the election are almost unbearably high. It's why I wrote the book and decided to put it out now and why I'll be doing whatever I can to help push people toward supporting a candidate with the most ambitious Green New Deal platform—so that they win the primaries and then the general."

Views

Iraq War criticism 
Klein has written about the Iraq War. In "Baghdad Year Zero" (Harper's Magazine, September 2004), Klein argues that, contrary to popular belief, the George W. Bush administration did have a clear plan for post-invasion Iraq: to build a completely unconstrained free market economy. She describes plans to allow foreigners to extract wealth from Iraq and the methods used to achieve those goals. Her "Baghdad Year Zero" was one of the inspirations for the 2008 film War, Inc.

Klein's "Bring Najaf to New York" (The Nation, August 2004) argued that Muqtada Al Sadr's Mahdi Army "represents the overwhelmingly mainstream sentiment in Iraq" and that, if he were elected, "Sadr would try to turn Iraq into a theocracy like Iran," although his immediate demands were for "direct elections and an end to foreign occupation".

Venezuela 

Klein signed a 2004 petition entitled "We would vote for Hugo Chávez". In 2007, she described Venezuela under the Chávez government as a country where "citizens had renewed their faith in the power of democracy to improve their lives,"  and described Venezuela as a place sheltered by Chávez's policies from the economic shocks produced by capitalism. Rather, according to Klein, Chávez protected his country from financial crisis by building "a zone of relative economic calm and predictability." According to reviewer Todd Gitlin, who described the overall argument of Klein's book The Shock Doctrine (2007) as "more right than wrong," Klein is "a romantic," who expected that the Chávez government would produce a bright future in which worker-controlled co-operatives would run the economy. The Shock Doctrine was consistent with her prior thinking about globalization, and in that book she describes Chávez' policies as an example of public control of some sectors of the economy as protecting poor people from harm caused by globalization. Mark Milke and conservative writer James Kirchick criticized Klein for her support of Chávez.

Criticism of Israel 
In March 2008, Klein was the keynote speaker at the first national conference of the Alliance of Concerned Jewish Canadians.  In January 2009, during the Gaza War, Klein supported the Boycott, Divestment and Sanctions (BDS) campaign against Israel, arguing that "the best strategy to end the increasingly bloody occupation is for Israel to become the target of the kind of global movement that put an end to apartheid in South Africa."

In summer 2009, on the occasion of the publication of the Hebrew translation of her book The Shock Doctrine, Klein visited Israel, the West Bank, and Gaza, combining the promotion of her book and the BDS campaign. In an interview to the Israeli newspaper Haaretz she emphasized that it was important to her "not to boycott Israelis but rather to boycott the normalization of Israel and the conflict." In a speech in Ramallah on June 27, she apologized to the Palestinians for not joining the BDS campaign earlier. Her remarks, particularly that "[Some Jews] even think we get one get-away-with-genocide-free card" were characterized by Noam Schimmel, an op-ed columnist in The Jerusalem Post, as "violent" and "unethical", and as the "most perverse of aspersions on Jews, an age-old stereotype of Jews as intrinsically evil and malicious."

Klein was also a spokesperson for the protest against the spotlight on Tel Aviv at the 2009 Toronto International Film Festival, a spotlight that Klein said was a very selective and misleading portrait of Israel.

Environmentalism 

By 2009, Klein's attention had turned to environmentalism, with particular focus on climate change, the subject of her book This Changes Everything (2014). According to her website in 2016, the book and its accompanying film (released in 2015) would be about "how the climate crisis can spur economic and political transformation."

She served on the board of directors of the non-profit group 350.org from April 7, 2011, through the fiscal year ending September 2018, and took part in their "Do the Math" tour in 2013, encouraging a divestment movement.

In an interview by Graeme Greene in New Internationalist, Klein rejected criticism that This Changes Everything politicized the climate issue and that the issue should be apolitical, asserting that such criticism reflected "how blind so many within the mainstream climate discussion are to the fact that they themselves are fully immersed within the confines of neoliberalism; ... It’s a fantasy that you could fundamentally shift the building blocks of your economy without engaging with politics."

She encouraged the Occupy movement to join forces with the environmental movement, saying the financial crisis and the climate crisis are similarly rooted in unrestrained corporate greed. She gave a speech at Occupy Wall Street where she described the world as "upside down", where we act as if "there is no end to what is actually finite—fossil fuels and the atmospheric space to absorb their emissions," and as if there are "limits to what is actually bountiful—the financial resources to build the kind of society we need."

She has been a particularly vocal critic of the Athabasca oil sands in Alberta, describing it in a TED talk as a form of "terrestrial skinning." On September 2, 2011, she attended the demonstration against the Keystone XL pipeline outside the White House and was arrested. Klein celebrated Obama's decision to postpone a decision on the Keystone pipeline until 2013 pending an environmental review as a victory for the environmental movement.

She attended the Copenhagen Climate Summit of 2009. She put the blame for the failure of Copenhagen on President Barack Obama, and described her own country, Canada, as a "climate criminal." She presented the Angry Mermaid Award (a satirical award designed to recognize the corporations who have best sabotaged the climate negotiations) to Monsanto.

Writing in the wake of Hurricane Sandy, she warned that the climate crisis constitutes a massive opportunity for disaster capitalists and corporations seeking to profit from crisis. But equally, the climate crisis "can be a historic moment to usher in the next great wave of progressive change," or a so-called "People's Shock."

In November 2016, following the election of Donald Trump as the 45th President of the United States, Klein called for an international campaign to impose economic sanctions on the United States if his administration refuses to abide by the terms of the Paris Agreement.

Other activities

Klein contributes to The Nation, In These Times, The Globe and Mail, This Magazine, Harper's Magazine, and The Guardian, and is a senior contributor for The Intercept. She is a former Miliband Fellow and lectured at the London School of Economics on the anti-globalization movement. Her appointment as the inaugural Gloria Steinem Endowed Chair in Media, Culture and Feminist Studies at Rutgers University–New Brunswick began in October 2018 and runs for 3 years.

Klein ranked 11th in an internet poll of the top global intellectuals of 2005, a list of the world's top 100 public intellectuals compiled by the Prospect magazine in conjunction with Foreign Policy magazine. She was involved in 2010 G-20 Toronto summit protests, condemning police force and brutality. She spoke to a rally seeking the release of protesters in front of police headquarters on June 28, 2010.

In October 2011, she visited Occupy Wall Street and gave a speech declaring the protest movement "the most important thing in the world". On November 10, 2011, she participated in a panel discussion about the future of Occupy Wall Street with four other panelists, including Michael Moore, William Greider, and Rinku Sen, in which she stressed the crucial nature of the evolving movement.
Klein also made an appearance in the British radio show Desert Island Discs on BBC Radio 4 in 2017.

Klein was a key instigator of the Leap Manifesto, a political manifesto issued in the context of the 2015 Canadian federal election focused on addressing the climate crisis through restructuring the Canadian economy and dealing with issues of income and wealth inequality, racism, and colonialism. The manifesto has been noted as an influence in the development of the Green New Deal and eventually led to the establishment of The Leap, an organization that works to promote the realization of the principles behind the original manifesto.

In November 2019, along with other public figures, Klein signed a letter supporting Labour Party leader Jeremy Corbyn describing him as "a beacon of hope in the struggle against emergent far-right nationalism, xenophobia and racism in much of the democratic world" and endorsed him in the 2019 UK general election.

From 2018 to 2021 she took a three-year appointment as the Gloria Steinem Chair in Media, Culture, and Feminist Studies at Rutgers University.

Honours and awards
 No Is Not Enough longlisted for the 2017 National Book Award for Nonfiction in the US
 2014 Hilary Weston Writers' Trust Prize for Nonfiction for This Changes Everything
 The Observer 'Book of the Year', This Changes Everything
 The Guardian, 'Readers' 10 best books of 2014' for This Changes Everything
 Book Review '100 Notable Books of the Year', This Changes Everything
 Warwick Prize for Writing, for The Shock Doctrine
 The New York Times Critics' Pick of the Year, The Shock Doctrine
 No Logo – Top 100 Non Fiction books of all-time list (2016), The Guardian
 Time magazine's list of Top 100 Non-Fiction books published since 1923, No Logo.
 Sydney Peace Prize, 2016
 Honorary doctorate, Saint Thomas University (2011)
 Honorary doctorate, University of Amsterdam (2019)

List of works

Books

Chapters

Articles

Filmography
 The Corporation (2003) (interviewee)
 The Take (2004) (writer)
 The Shock Doctrine (2009) (writer)
 Catastroika (2012) (appearance)
 This Changes Everything (2015)

See also 

 Alter-globalization
 Leap Manifesto
 Green New Deal

References

External links 

 
 
  (and others)
 
 

 
1970 births
Living people
20th-century Canadian non-fiction writers
20th-century Canadian women writers
21st-century Canadian non-fiction writers
21st-century Canadian women writers
Activists from Montreal
American Book Award winners
Anglophone Quebec people
Anti-consumerists
Anti-corporate activists
Anti-globalization writers
Canadian anti-war activists
Canadian anti-capitalists
Canadian anti-fascists
Canadian democratic socialists
Canadian documentary film directors
Canadian economics writers
Canadian environmentalists
Canadian feminist writers
Canadian pacifists
Canadian people of American-Jewish descent
Canadian political journalists
Canadian socialists
Canadian women activists
Canadian women environmentalists
Canadian women journalists
Canadian women non-fiction writers
Climate activists
Ecofeminists
Jewish anti-fascists
Jewish feminists
Jewish philosophers
Jewish socialists
Jewish women writers
Lecturers
Lewis family (Canada)
Left-wing politics in Canada
Left-libertarians
Philosophers of culture
Philosophers of economics
Philosophers of history
Progressivism in Canada
Political philosophers
Canadian social commentators
Secular Jews
Social philosophers
Canadian socialist feminists
The Globe and Mail people
The Nation (U.S. magazine) people
Third-wave feminism
Toronto Star people
University of Toronto alumni
Canadian women documentary filmmakers
Women political writers
Writers about activism and social change
Writers from Montreal
Jewish Canadian journalists
Jewish Canadian filmmakers
Canadian women film directors